Reservation Virodhi Dal (Antireservation Party) is a political party in the Indian state of Punjab. The party was floated in October 1999 by the General Category Welfare Federation of Punjab. The party is opposed to affirmative action quotas and reservations. The convenor of the party is Raghunandan Singh.

References

Political parties in Punjab, India
1999 establishments in Punjab, India
Political parties established in 1999